Kim Ju-song (김주성; born 15 October 1993) is a North Korean footballer who plays as a striker for April 25.

References

External links
Kim Ju-song at Asian Games Incheon 2014
Kim Ju-song at DPRKFootball

1993 births
Living people
North Korean footballers
North Korea international footballers
Association football forwards
Footballers at the 2014 Asian Games
Asian Games medalists in football
Asian Games silver medalists for North Korea
Medalists at the 2014 Asian Games